Catherine Black may refer to:

 Catherine Black (Millennium), a character on the TV series Millennium
 Catherine Black (actress), Canadian film, TV and stage actress
 Catherine Black (nurse) (1878–1949), Irish nurse

See also
 Cathie Black (Cathleen Prunty Black, born 1944), educator, and president and publisher of USA Today